Shade Empire is a Finnish symphonic black metal band, formed in 1999 in the city of Kuopio.

Shade Empire's prevalent lyrical subjects are death, destruction, hatred, anti-religion and pain. The music on their first three official full-length releases, Sinthetic, Intoxicate O.S. and Zero Nexus, bears a melodic sort of black metal, featuring the usage of both electronic and symphonic elements. Their lyrics are mainly in English, except for one song that has lyrics in Finnish, "...Ja Pimeys Laskeutui", the title of which can be translated as "...And Darkness Descended" (the last word "Laskeutui" can also be translated as "Fell", "Came" or "Landed").

The third demo CD of the band, Essence of Pain, raised the interest of the Italian label Avantgarde Music. As a result, their debut album Sinthetic was released on March 29, 2004, under the aforementioned label.

In 2006, the band signed with the Finnish label Dynamic Arts Records. The same year, their second album, Intoxicate O.S., was released on May 24, 14 days after the release of the single "Slitwrist Ecstasy". Intoxicate O.S. had moderate success, reaching number 25 in weekly Finnish album sales.

After releasing the album, Shade Empire continued playing at several events such as Jörisrock and Qstock, mainly beside other Finnish artists. They also performed on a series of independent gigs. The same year, Shade Empire played their first official concert outside of Finland, in the encompassment of the Popkomm trade show in Berlin at the Kulturbrauerei (Culture Brewery). The band released their fourth album in the 6 May 2013. Called Omega Arcane, it was released via Candlelight Records.

On April 11, 2017 the band announced that their long-time vocalist Juha Harju has been dismissed from the band, to be replaced by Henry Hämäläinen. The upcoming album will still feature Juha on vocals.

Gallery

Discography

Studio albums 
Sinthetic (2004)
Intoxicate O.S. (2006)
Zero Nexus (2008)
Omega Arcane (2013)
Poetry of the Ill-Minded (2017)

Singles and EPs 
Slitwrist Ecstasy (2006)
Anti-Life Saviour (2017)

Live and other albums 
Throne of Eternal Night (2000, demo)
Daemon (2001, demo)
Essence of Pain (2002, demo)

Members

Present 
Henry Hämäläinen – vocals (2017–present)
Juha Sirkkiä – guitars (2000–present)
Eero Mantere – bass guitar (1999–present)
Erno Räsänen – drums (2006–present)
Aapeli Kivimäki - guitars (2013–present)

Previous members
Tero Liimatainen – guitars (1999-2000)
Antti Makkonen – drums (1999–2006)
Janne Niiranen – guitars (1999-2013)
Juha Harju – vocals (2000-2017)
Olli Savolainen – synthesizers (2000–2021)

Timeline

References

External links

 
 Dynamic Arts Records
 [ Shade Empire] at AllMusic
 Shade Empire at MySpace

Finnish black metal musical groups
Musical groups established in 1999
Symphonic black metal musical groups
1999 establishments in Finland